Marguerite H. Smith was a state legislator in Maine. She lived in Falmouth, Maine and represented Cumberland County, Maine in 1957, 1959, 1961, and 1963. She was a Republican.

References

Year of birth missing (living people)
Living people
20th-century American women politicians
Women state legislators in Maine
20th-century American politicians
Maine Republicans
People from Falmouth, Maine